Ashraf Hendricks (born 28 July 1984 in Cape Town, Western Cape) is a South African football (soccer) defender who was capped for South Africa.

References

1984 births
Living people
Sportspeople from Cape Town
Cape Coloureds
South African soccer players
South Africa international soccer players
Association football defenders
Bidvest Wits F.C. players
Hellenic F.C. players
Vasco da Gama (South Africa) players
Moroka Swallows F.C. players
Mpumalanga Black Aces F.C. players
South African Premier Division players
National First Division players